The Minus 5 is the self-titled seventh full-length album by American rock band The Minus 5. Featuring a lineup of Scott McCaughey, Peter Buck (of R.E.M.), Bill Rieflin, and John Ramberg, it was released in 2006 on Yep Roc Records. The album features contributions from Kelly Hogan, Colin Meloy of The Decemberists, and Sean Nelson of Harvey Danger. It is often referred to as "The Gun Album."

Track listing
Rifle Called Goodbye – 3:02
Aw Shit Man – 1:41
Out There on the Maroon – 2:37
My Life as a Creep – 2:21
With a Gun – 4:33
Cemetery Row – 3:32
Twilight Distillery – 2:57
Cigarettes Coffee and Booze – 4:25
Leftover Life to Kill – 4:23
Hotel Senator – 2:56
Bought a Rope – 4:11
All Worn Out – 2:19
Original Luke – 3:02
Japanese edition bonus tracks
All the Time – 4:19
Teenage Idol – 2:35

References

External links

The Minus 5 at Rate Your Music

2006 albums
The Minus 5 albums
Yep Roc Records albums